Synostocephalus is an extinct genus of dicynodont from late Permian South Africa and Zimbabwe. It is possibly a member of Eumantellidae.

References

Dicynodonts
Permian synapsids of Africa
Fossil taxa described in 1935
Anomodont genera